Korean television drama, sometimes known as "K-Drama", refers to Korean-language television shows of the drama genre produced in South Korea.

Korean drama began in May 1956 with the film Death Row Prisoner, directed by Choi Chang Bong. The genre rose in popularity through the 1960s and 70s with the growth of Korean broadcasting companies, and began showing on colour television in 1981.

In the 1990s and 2000s, youth-oriented, soap-opera style Korean dramas took hold, and pushed the Korean drama genre into the international sphere. They have since contributed to the worldwide spread of Korean culture, known as the "Korean Wave".

Start of Korean drama in 1956

In May 1956, commercial broadcasting company HLKZ-TV opened. Its first film was Death Row Prisoner, directed by Choi Chang Bong, which was based on Holwash Hall's story.

1960s Korean drama 

And with the opening of KBS-TV at the end of December 61, television dramas began to gain momentum.
In the early 60s, single-act dramas such as "Friday Theater" and "Continuous Historical Drama" were aired, and daily soap operas were the main ones entering the late 60s.

The most popular drama in the '60s was "Sajikgol Old West Room," which aired in 1967, and the first daily soap opera was "Snowfall" by Dongyang TV in 1968. Meanwhile, "The Frog Husband," which aired on MBC in 1969, caused a social stir for the first time in the nation's drama history, based on an affair.

And, Yuho, who is also known as the lyricist of the wise man's song "Moon of Silla," has earned fame as a first-generation drama writer. In 1945, at the age of 25, he began writing radio dramas at Gyeongseong Broadcasting Station, and he also had great success as a drama writer, starting with the TBC drama "First Snow" which opened in 1961. Double-income couples and "You're Here in Straw Century" gained explosive popularity, and the broadcasting station even organized a soap opera called "Yuho Theater" named after the writer.

The drama written by Yoo-ho became a hot topic right after the show aired, and the broadcaster invited viewers to the front of the TV every time, so the broadcaster took him to the point where he provided a car in addition to the manuscript fee and full-time fee. In the 1960s, Yoo Ho showed off his powerful power in the drama industry, calling it "TBC itself."

The best star writer of the '60s was Hanunsa, as much as Yu-ho. Having made his debut as a full-time writer in 1957 after serving as a novelist and reporter, he quickly became the center of a CBS drama. Starting with the first TV daily drama, "It's Snowing," "Hello, Seoul," etc., the 60s and 70s were the "era of Hanunsa."

He has shown an outstanding ability as a screenwriter as well as a TV drama. With his masterpieces such as <To Do This Life> <Hyunhae-tan knows> <South and North Red Mahura> and <Three Narutors>, he has established a solid position across TV and movies.

1970s Korean drama 

In 1972, TBC had a huge impact on the drama industry in the '70s through a work called Yeoro. And in the 70s, the increase in broadcasting companies led to competition among the three broadcasting stations - KBS, TBC, and MBC - to produce dramas. Entering the 70s, three broadcasters—KBS, TBC, and MBC—competed in soap operas.

Broadcast on TBC from 1970, "Ah-SSI" depicts a typical Korean female figure who lives at the expense of herself for her family, with the turbulent period of history ranging from the 1910s to the 70s as the backdrop of the times. In addition, "Yeoro," which aired on KBS in 1972, ran a popular road, drawing sympathy from viewers, with its silly but pure protagonist, frugal marital love and the pain of separated families. Other major dramas in the 70s include "The Investigation Team Leader," "Jang Hee-bin" and "Hometown of Legend."

And in 1971, the drama 'The Investigation Team Leader' was also very popular at that time. "The Investigation Team Leader," which began airing in March 1971, aired a total of 880 episodes until its end in October 1989. The writers alone went through Kim Jung-hwan, Yoon Dae-sung, Shin Myung-soon, Lee Sang-Hyun and Park Chan-sung, while the directors also started with Heo Gyu, followed by Park Chul, Yoo Heung-Ryul, Lee Yeon-Heon, Ko Seok-man and Choi Jong-soo. "The Investigation Team Leader," which began airing in March 1971, aired a total of 880 episodes until its end in October 1989. The writers alone went through Kim Jung-hwan, Yoon Dae-sung, Shin Myung-soon, Lee Sang-Hyun, and Park Chan-sung, while the directors also started with Heo Gyu, followed by Park Chul, Yoo Heung-Ryul, Lee Yeon-Heon, Ko Seok-man, and Choi Jong-soo.

1980s Korean drama 

On December 1, 1980, South Korea became the 81st country in the world to open the era of color TV broadcasting. Show programs with colorful stages have sprung up and the genre of dramas has expanded as the amount of outdoor filming has increased. The most popular actresses of the '80s were Won Mi-kyung, Lee Mi-sook, Hwang Shin-hye, Choi Myung-gil and Jang Mi-hee. Even in the 1980s, the work of Kim Soo-Hyun, an undisputedly popular writer, also topped the rating list.

In that time, the best star writer was Kim Soo-Hyun. In 1984, she achieved his heyday with nearly 80% viewer ratings with the drama "Love and Truth," which depicts the fate of her reversed sisters, and once again showed off his potential to write myths with "Love and Ambition" in 1987. It is at this time that the brand "Kim Soo-Hyun Drama" is clearly engraved in the head of the general public.

Sand Castle, which was broadcast in 1988, was an unprecedented hit. "Sanding," an eight-part affair starring Park Geun-Hyung, Kim Hye-ja and Kim Chung-Eun, was a filial work that strengthened the Kim Soo-Hyun era with explosive support from female viewers. After the announcement of the cancellation of the game broadcast during the Olympics, the MBC Drama Bureau received a flurry of protest calls, which eventually led to a normal broadcast. 

Kim Soo-Hyun's power was so strong that she was able to penetrate the sky, but rival star writers were born one after another. The main character was definitely Na Yeon-sook. Na Yeon-sook, who gained fame as "Kim Soo-hyun's Rival" in the 1980s, quickly emerged as a hit writer of the time, writing KBS' "Daldongne" and "Normal People." 

Among them, none other than KBS 2TV's "Time of Ambition," which aired in 1989. The drama starred Lee Myung-bak in a former president of Hyundai Engineering & Construction Co., boasted huge popularity, together in front of the male viewers TV. Thanks to the drama, Lee Myung-bak is called 'The 9-to-5' and lawmakers, market, and served as president for 15 years. Yu In-chon, who starred in the drama also in charge of the Minister of Culture Lee Myung-bak administration.

Kim Jung-soo, famous for MBC's MBCAll-Won Diary, was also one of the star writers of the 1980s. Having helped turn rural drama <Wonwon Diary> into a national drama, she went through <Winter Fog> and <Happy Woman> to show her writing skills as a drama writer.

It also hinted at the legitimacy of the regime through the "500th Anniversary of the Joseon Dynasty" and "Nationality," and political dramas such as "The First Republic" were also aired. Popular dramas in the '80s are "ordinary people," which contain the joys and sorrows and conflicts of So Si-min through the daily lives of a family. Other popular dramas in the '80s include "Daldongne," "Love and Truth," "Jeonwon Diary" and "Three Han-bung Families."

1990s Korean drama 

Popular TV dramas in the 1980s and 1990s boosted real-time water consumption, which reduced tap water usage and even vehicle operation on the road during each broadcast time.

The '90s are the heyday of youth and trendy dramas. Starting with "Our Heaven," "The Last Match" and "Jealousy" have become popular, producing numerous popular stars such as Jang Dong-gun, Choi Jin-sil and Shim Eun-ha. Also, a cheerful home drama was popular. "What's Love?" "Daughter's House" and "Men in a Bathhouse" are representative works. In particular, "What's Love?" which comically depicts the story of a patriarchal, self-confessed family and a peaceful, democratic family, ranked second in viewership ever. 

Sandglass, which left the famous line "Am I trembling now," became popular, portraying the gloomy 80s situation realistically. Broadcast in 1999, "The Trap of Youth" took over the small screen, portraying the story of a woman avenging a man who betrayed her. In particular, Shim Eun-ha, who plays Seo Yoon-hee, who left the famous line, "I'm going to destroy everything," which is still talked about, is considered the epitome of the villain's performance.

2000s Korean drama 
In the 2000s, soap operas based on stimulated materials began to become popular.
In the early and mid-2000s, dramas led the early Korean Wave. Bae Yong-joon and Choi Ji-woo, the main characters of "Winter Sonata," have sparked a Korean Wave craze in Japan and the explosive popularity of dramas has led to a 35.5 percent increase in Japanese tourists in 2004. Daejanggeum, which aired in 2003, was also exported to more than 60 countries around the world as the top contributor to the Korean Wave. Daejanggeum also had a phenomenal audience rating of over 80 percent in Iran, barren land of the Korean Wave. In the 2000s, modern movies such as "Autumn Fairy Tales," "The Little Mermaid," "All In" and "My Name is Kim Sam Soon" were also popular, while historical dramas such as "Queen Myeongseong," "Lady Incheonha" and "Jumong" were also in their prime.     

And also, a series of infidelity dramas focused on individual desires appeared. Kim Hee-ae's "My Man's Woman" (2007), who turned into a lion-headed infidelity woman, and "Temptation of Wife" (2009), which gave birth to Min So-hee, who came back from her fortune-telling, have emerged as subjects that women show their desires differently than before.

Furthermore, in the 2000s, the number of viewers of foreign dramas increased and their tastes diversified. In particular, criminal investigations have become popular with the success of American dramas. In Korea, dramas such as "Byul Soon-gum," "Special Crime Scandal," "TEN," "Hit," and "Sign" have been relatively active in Korean genres, crossing cable channels and terrestrial channels. Like the drama "Hit" that actively utilizes the melodrama code and "Sign," which borrows the narratives of American dramas, melodrama and narrative dramas were evaluated as Korean-style genres. In addition, "The Ghost" and "The Chaser" have shattered viewers' hopes for a sweet story. It was notable that realistic narratives were added to the plot of the genre.

2010s Korean drama 
A major feature of dramas in the 2010s is that they opened the heyday of the so-called Korean-style romance fantasy genre, combining a world of fantasy, which is far from realistic, but persuasive production, acting, and script. Compared to the previous era, male characters had excellent abilities, but they were boundlessly vulnerable to their own women, and women's characters were not necessarily protected even if they were poor according to the times, but they were more enterprising in talking about their own arguments and solving problems on their own. Just like fantasy tendencies, attempts to reinterpret subjects or characters that were difficult to see in existing romance movies such as supernatural powers, aliens, goblins, and Yoon-hoi were also notable.

Lee Min-ho, Kim Soo-hyun, Song Joong-ki, Kim Woo-bin, Park Shin-hye, and Seo Hyun-jin emerged as new drama stars representing the 2010s, while actors in their 30s and 40s, including Gong Yoo, Lee Dong-wook, Song Hye-kyo, Jeon Ji-hyun, Ha Ji-won and Jang Dong-gun, also opened their second heyday through dramas. While the main targets of the Korean Wave were Japan and Southeast Asia until the 1990s and the 2000s, the Korean Wave craze began in China in the 2010s, and drama was at the center of this craze. In addition to the "Chicken and Beer" craze brought by "My Love from the Star," famous lines, famous scenes, fashion, OSTs, and major filming locations in China have caused syndromes there.

However, ignoring the assessment that it is the golden age of drama, the 2010s were the worst Dark Ages for historical period dramas, especially in the field of "Daeha Drama," called traditional historical dramas. In fact, the production of historical dramas has slowed down since the late 2000s, as major dramas dealing with the Three Kingdoms Period and Korea History suffered a series of crushing defeats in ratings and completeness. In addition, as the status of terrestrial broadcasters in the drama market decreased in the 2010s and the market environment was reorganized around the cable and general programming, the atmosphere of avoiding high-quality historical dramas began to form.

And the drama market, which was led by only three terrestrial broadcasters, has changed since the 2010s as general programming and cable channels jumped in.
Wearing a televised 'Stars from you' in 2014 is a new Korean history. Japan, unlike huge popularity and profits of scale in China with the center's popularity and opened an era 'The 3.0'. Followed by 'Pinocchio' reached the highest price China was sold for $28 million (about 300 million 1127 million won) per session.

On the other hand, the multichannel era for general service and cable TV breakthroughs. Cable drama 'Reply 1997' and 'Reply 1994' is it offers nostalgic value in the 1990s and the best ratings ever. The work of the pros and cons of being green tvn 'Misaeng' receiving enthusiastic support of the office workers and caused a social sensation.

References

Drama
Korean culture